Cody Wise (born December 29, 1995) is an American singer signed to Interscope Records through will.i.am's imprint. He is best known for featuring on "It's My Birthday" by will.i.am. The song, which was recorded in 2014 and released as a single on May 27, 2014, topped the charts in the United Kingdom and peaked within the top ten of the charts in Australia. In addition to his music career, Wise has also made appearances in theater productions.

Life and career
Wise was born in the Roxborough neighborhood of Philadelphia. He first started playing young Simba in the Broadway musical The Lion King and then followed with Broadway's Damn Yankees alongside Sean Hayes. He also had parts in The Scottsboro Boys and The Nutcracker. Wise's rendition of The Jackson 5's "Who's Loving You" at a concert called Fam Jams in Philadelphia caught the attention of will.i.am. Wise was just 13 at the time. He spent a few years developing his musical skills with encouragement from will.i.am. In 2014, Wise signed to Interscope Records and he has since then released a number of songs online among which "It's My Birthday". will.i.am and Wise performed the song in the United Kingdom on May 29, 2014, appearing on the fourth semi-final of the eighth season of Britain's Got Talent.

Discography

Singles

As lead artist

As featured artist

Other appearances

References

1995 births
21st-century American singers
Living people
Musicians from Philadelphia
Interscope Records artists
21st-century American male singers